The Quad City Riverhawks were a team of the Premier Basketball League that previously played in the modern American Basketball Association (ABA).

History

The team began play as a member of the ABA in 2006.  The team played at the Activities Center at Marycrest College in Davenport, Iowa.

Finishing second place in the White Central division with a 24–9 record, the 'Hawks earned the #9 seed in the ABA Playoffs, defeating their brother franchise, the Sauk Valley Rollers in the first round by a score of 100–86, and then scoring a forfeit win over Central division champion Minnesota Ripknees (who had decided not to play in the playoffs due to a monetary dispute).  The 'Hawks would lose to eventual ABA runner-up Texas Tycoons in the quarterfinals by a score of 125–123.

The Riverhawks changed venues to the Wharton Field House in Moline, Illinois (former home to the NBA's Tri-Cities Blackhawks and later the CBA's Quad City Thunder), and changed their affiliation to the Premier Basketball League along with their brother franchise, the Rock River Fury.  They had a successful season on the court, winning the regular season PBL West title.

Due to venue issues, the Riverhawks elected to take the 2008-2009 PBL season off.

See also
Quad City Eagles
Quad City Mallards

References

External links
Official Website
League Website

Former Premier Basketball League teams
Riverhawks
Basketball teams in Illinois
Defunct American Basketball Association (2000–present) teams
2006 establishments in Illinois
2008 disestablishments in Illinois
Basketball teams established in 2006
Basketball teams disestablished in 2008